Alliaria is a genus of flowering plants in the family Brassicaceae.

Species include:
Alliaria petiolata (M.Bieb.) Cavara & Grande
Alliaria taurica (Adam) V.I.Dorof.

References

External links
 

Brassicaceae
Brassicaceae genera